Oğuzhan Eroğlu (born 13 March 1991), better known by his stage name Keişan, is a Turkish rapper and songwriter. He began his career when he was 16 as solo.

Discography

Albums
Aranan Adam 2 (2019)
Karantina (EP) (2020)
12 (feat. Anıl Piyancı) (2022)

Singles
Nefret Ediyorum (2018)
Lamborghini (2018)
Ne Bakıyon Dayı Dayı (feat. Anıl Piyancı) (2019)
T E S L A (Remix) (2019)
G U C C I (Remix) (2019)
Karanlık (2020)
Daha Boktan (2020)
Kim O (feat. Ben Fero) (2020)
Ağır Ağır (2020)
Elmas (2020)
Yakala (feat. Redo) (2020)
Düşerken (2020)
İyiyim İyi (2021)
Kasılma (feat. Dianz) (2021)
İtfaiye (feat. Mert Şenel) (2021)
Maşallah (feat. Arraf) (2021)
Düşerken (Remix) (feat. Berkay Duman & Slong) (2021)
Pare Pare (feat. Anıl Piyancı) (2022)
Altıpatlar (feat. Reckol & Çakal) (2022)
Kuşku (feat. Anıl Piyancı) (2022)

References 

Living people
1991 births
Turkish rappers
Turkish male singers
Turkish hip hop
Turkish lyricists
People from Ankara